
Togetherness may refer to:

Solidarity

Film and TV
Togetherness (film), a 1970 film by Arthur Marks
Togetherness Supreme, a 2010 Kenyan film
Togetherness (TV series), a 2015 HBO series

Music

Albums
Togetherness (Don Cherry album), a 1966 album by Don Cherry
Togetherness, a 1967 album by Allan Sherman
Togetherness (album), a 1978 album by L.T.D.
Togetherness, a 1960 album by Lenny Bruce
Togetherness, a 2003 album by Gretchen Phillips
Togetherness, a 2005 album by Ronnie Aldrich

Songs
"Togetherness", a 1955 song by Johnny Desmond
"Togetherness", a 1958 song by Andy Griffith
"Togetherness", a 1960 song by Frankie Avalon
 covered by Michael Preston, 1960
"Togetherness", a 1968 song by Freddie Hart
 covered in 1970 by Buck Owens and Susan Raye
"Togetherness", a 1975 song by reggae singer Clinton Fearon
"Togetherness", a 1977 song by Horace Silver
"Togetherness", a 2010 song by The New Pornographers
"Togetherness", a song by Ray Charles on the 1973 album Jazz Number II
"Togetherness", a song by Don Cherry from the albums Togetherness (1966) and Orient (1974)

See also
 Together (disambiguation)